Prevention of Blindness Trust, also known as the POB Trust and POB, is a project of Pakistan Islamic Medical Association. POB Trust was established and registered by Trust Act in July 2007 as a leading volunteer eye care organization with the sole mission of preventing blindness and preserving sight. POB Trust was declared exempted from tax in 2012 by Federal Board of Revenue (Pakistan) POB Trust endeavors to develop strategies for prevention and control of blindness and visual impairment. The prime objective of POB Trust is to promote and sustain a global campaign against all forms of avoidable blindness with emphasis on deprived communities. This initiative brings with it a great challenge and an exciting hope for all who work towards this goal. It is also a member of the International Agency for the Prevention of Blindness for the VISION 2020: The Right to Sight.

Activities

The POB Trust was registered in 2007, but the organization had been working in the field since 2005. Until July 2021, approximately US$7.5 million had been spent on its projects of free eye care services involving 203,189 cataract surgeries of patients in 20 countries.  POB Trust has been working in many areas:

 Free Eye Camps Pakistan
 Free Eye Camps in poor countries.
 Higher Surgical Training
 School Eye Care Services.
 Emergency Relief:  Earth Quake, Floods, IDP's.
 Prison Eye Care.
 Social Activities.
 Blind Rehabilitation Program.
 Community Centers: Jarranwala District Faisalabad, Channan Kharian District Gujrat.
 POB Eye Hospitals: Lahore and Karachi
 Public Awareness Campaigns

POB Trust organizes free eye camps in remote areas of the country. Every camp lasts for 2 to 4 days according to the location. During each free eye camp, 1000-3000 patients are screened for cataracts and if diagnosed, they are referred for diagnostic tests including Hepatitis B, C Screening. Tests are performed free of cost in the camp. After passing these tests patient goes towards surgery, and about 100-300 patients undergo the surgery in three days. Cataract surgeries are done with Intraocular lens implantation with a small incision and phacoemulsification. Reading glasses and eye drops are also distributed.

From 2005 to March 2019, the trust has achieved the following milestones: 22 countries in Asia and Africa 730 free eye camps. Over 1,418,000 patients were examined and treated. Over 203,189 cataract surgeries with lens implantation. Over 1.9 million pairs of reading glasses were distributed.

Partners

POB Trust worked in shared projects with many other organizations like Helping Hand for Relief & Development Pakistan (HHRD-Pakistan), Akhwat, Al Khidmat Foundation, Federation of Islamic Medical Associations Save Vision, Pak Trust UK, Pakistan Islamic Medical Association and with Ministry of Health Pakistan.

POB Eye Hospitals

Lahore
 720 Kamran Block Allama Iqbal Town Lahore. 042-35414720

 7 kilometers Main Raiwind Road, Lahore.

Karachi
Address: C -15 Block 12, Gulistan e Johar Near Munawar Chowrangi, Karachi. 021-34156597

POB Trust activities during this period were based in 20 countries, as follows:

Countries of activities
Sudan, Chad, Somalia, Somali land, Nigeria, Mali, Senegal, Sri Lanka, Burkina Faso, Niger, Indonesia, Cameroon, Morocco, Zimbabwe, Gambia, Gaza Palestine, Bangladesh, South Africa, Maldives and Pakistan.

International Recognition

1. Richard and Hinda Rosenthal award from The Rosenthal Family Foundation is given to Dr. Pervaiz Malik on Prevention of Blindness Services recognition. Date is 24 April 2009.
2. Pakistan Society of Ophthalmology award in 2011 (see category 'OSP PICO Gold Medal on page 3)
3. Asia Pacific Academy of Ophthalmology Outstanding service in prevention of blindness Award

Research Published
1. Prevalence of Refractive Errors in a public school children of Lahore2. Private Public Mix Working Model of a Teaching Hospital, Benefits for the Organizations and End users

References

Blindness organizations
Medical and health organisations based in Pakistan